Tom Rooney (30 November 1881 – 5 February 1939) was an American racecar driver. He made three AAA Championship Car race starts between 1912 and 1916, including the 1916 Indianapolis 500. He also raced production cars and was a factory superintendent for the car company ReVere. He entered the 1920 Indianapolis 500 but his entry was declined as he failed his race physical due to previous racing injuries. His best Championship race finish was second place on the board oval at Sheepshead Bay Race Track.

Indy 500 results

References

1881 births
1939 deaths
Indianapolis 500 drivers
People from Woburn, Massachusetts
Racing drivers from Boston
Racing drivers from Massachusetts
Sportspeople from Middlesex County, Massachusetts